The Penderwicks at Point Mouette is a children's novel by Jeanne Birdsall, published by Knopf in 2011. It is the third book in The Penderwicks series, and is preceded by The Penderwicks on Gardam Street. The remaining books in the series are The Penderwicks in Spring and The Penderwicks at Last, the last of them being published in 2018.

The main setting of the book, Point Mouette, is based on Ocean Point, near Boothbay Harbor in Maine.

References 

2011 American novels
American children's novels
Novels set in Massachusetts
Books by Jeanne Birdsall
2011 children's books
Alfred A. Knopf books